Pozharki is a rural locality (a khutor) in Lentyevskoye Rural Settlement, Ustyuzhensky District, Vologda Oblast, Russia. The population was 1 as of 2002.

Geography 
Sysoyevo is the nearest rural locality.

References 

Rural localities in Ustyuzhensky District